This is a list of Assamese language television channels in India.

Government Owned Channels
DD Assam
DD North-East

General Entertainment
Jonack
Rang
Rengoni

Movie
Indradhanu

Music
Ramdhenu

News
Prag News
DY 365
News18 Assam-North East
News Live
Assam Talks
Pratidin Time
NKTV Plus
ND 24
DA News Plus
NB News
Pratham Khabar 24*7

See also
List of English-language television channels in India
List of HD channels in India
List of Hindi-language television channels
List of Permitted Private Satellite Channels 

Assamese language
List
Assamese language
Television
Television